Edwin N. Appleton (August 28, 1877 – September 26, 1937) was an American marine who received the Medal of Honor for bravery during the Boxer Rebellion.

Biography
Appleton was born August 28, 1877, in Brooklyn, New York, and after entering the US Marine Corps in 1898 he was sent as a Corporal to China to fight in the Boxer Rebellion. On June 20, 1900, while fighting in Tientsin, China he crossed the river in a small boat while under heavy enemy fire and  assisted in destroying several buildings occupied by the enemy.

He died September 26, 1937, and is buried in Green-Wood Cemetery,
Brooklyn, New York. His grave can be found in section K/111, lot 13724/41 in the Anderson Mausoleum.

Medal of Honor citation
Rank and organization: Corporal, U.S. Marine Corps. Born: 29 August 1876, Brooklyn, N.Y. Accredited to: New York. G.O. No.: 84, 22 March 1902.

Citation:

In action against the enemy at Tientsin, China, 20 June 1900. Crossing the river in a small boat while under heavy enemy fire, Appleton assisted in destroying buildings occupied by the enemy.

See also

List of Medal of Honor recipients
List of Medal of Honor recipients for the Boxer Rebellion

References

External links

1877 births
1937 deaths
United States Marine Corps Medal of Honor recipients
United States Marines
American military personnel of the Boxer Rebellion
People from Brooklyn
Burials at Green-Wood Cemetery
Boxer Rebellion recipients of the Medal of Honor
United States Army officers